Tambourines to Glory is a gospel play with music by Langston Hughes and Jobe Huntley which tells the story of two female street preachers who open a storefront church in Harlem. The play premiered on Broadway in 1963.

Background
Hughes began writing Tambourines to Glory: A Play with Songs in July 1956, and later that year turned it into a novel, which was published by John Day in 1958.

Production
The play opened on Broadway at the Little Theatre November 2, 1963 and closed on November 23, 1963. The playbill for the 1963 premiere makes reference to the "gospel singing play" being adapted from Hughes' novel.

The opening night cast featured a who's who of African-American performers, including:
Joseph Attles 
Louis Gossett Jr. 
Micki Grant 
Robert Guillaume  
Carl Hall
Rosalie King
Rosetta LeNoire  
Theresa Merritt Hines
Clara Ward  
Judd Jones
Hilda Simms
Thelma Carpenter (standby)

Reception 
The musical was generally well-received but generated some criticism from certain segments of the black intelligentsia, who felt that the themes of corruption and hypocrisy mocked the black church. Howard Taubman, in his review in The New York Times wrote: "The leading players are supported by an ensemble overflowing with energy and a zest for song. Like their play, they'd all be more usefully employed if they had more gospel songs to sing and less story to tell."

References

External links
Internet Broadway Database Listing

1956 musicals
Broadway musicals
Plays by Langston Hughes
John Day Company books